Consaca is a town and municipality in the Nariño Department, Colombia. It is a town and municipality of Nariño Colombia, and has 12.639 inhabitants. Consaca is located near the Galeras Volcano and is 54 Kilometers away by car from the city San Juan de Pasto. Consaca is known by the name "Historical corner of Colombia".

Tourism
The nearby "Green Lake" is a place of surrounded by exotic flora and fauna, the color green is due to the amount of sulphur in the water.

The Bolivar Monument (Piedra de Bolivar) is located in Bombona, 6 km away from the town center and it is a place of historical importance for Colombia owing to the event that took place on 7 April 1822 during Simon Bolivar's battle for the Liberty.

Veredas 

Consacá comprises 30 veredas

San Rafael, Churupamba, Hatillo Bajo, Santa Inés, Caracol, Hatillo Alto, Cariaco Alto, Campamento, Villa Inéz, Jossepe, El Juncal, Villa Rosa, Cariaco Bajo, La Aguada, San José del Salado, Alto Bomboná, Tinajillas, El Guabo, Ciudadela Bomboná, Veracruz, Brisas del Guáitara, San Antonio, La Loma, El Edén, Rumipamba, Cajabamba, Paltapamba, El Tejar y El Cucho.

External links
  Official Consaca Website

Municipalities of Nariño Department